Yersinia bercovieri is a Gram-negative species of enteric bacteria.

Etymology
Yersinia bercovieri, N.L. gen. masc. n. bercovieri, of Bercovier, named in honor of Hervé Bercovier, who first described biogroups 3A and 3B for Yersinia enterocolitica. These biogroups are now known as Yersinia mollaretii and Yersinia bercovieri respectively.

References

Further reading

External links
LSPN lpsn.dsmz.de

Type strain of Yersinia bercovieri at BacDive -  the Bacterial Diversity Metadatabase

bercovieri
Bacteria described in 1988